The Eight Musts are a policy set by the General Secretary Xi Jinping administration regarding the role of the Chinese Communist Party in Chinese society.

Policy
The Eight Musts are:
we must persist in the dominant role of the people; 必须坚持人民主体地位; Bìxū jiānchí rénmín zhǔtǐ dìwèi
we must persist in liberating and developing social productive forces; 必须坚持解放和发展社会生产力; Bìxū jiānchí jiěfàng hé fāzhǎn shèhuì shēngchǎnlì
we must persist in moving reform and opening-up forward; 必须坚持推进改革开放; Bìxū jiānchí tuījìn gǎigékāifàng
we must persist in safeguarding social fairness and justice; 必须坚持维护社会公平正义; Bìxū jiānchí wéihù shèhuì gōngpíng zhèngyì
we must persist in marching the path of being well-to-do together; 必须坚持走共同富裕道路; Bìxū jiānchí zǒu gòngtóng fùyù dàolù
we must persist in stimulating social harmony; 必须坚持促进社会和谐; Bìxū jiānchí cùjìn shèhuì héxié
we must persist in peaceful development; 必须坚持和平发展; Bìxū jiānchí hépíng fāzhǎn
we must persist in the leadership of the Party. 必须坚持党的领导; Bìxū jiānchí dǎng de lǐngdǎo

See also

Ideology of the Chinese Communist Party

References

Ideology of the Chinese Communist Party